Women Artists Action Group (W.A.A.G.) was an Irish feminist artists group founded with the goal of promoting the profile of women artists from Ireland, which was active from 1987 to 1991.

History
Women Artists Action Group was founded in 1987 by Pauline Cummins, Breeda Mooney, and Louise Walsh. Cummins served as the group's first chair. It had an equivalent organisation in Northern Ireland, N.I.W.A.A.G. They were founded as a reaction to the perceived lack of representation of women artists in exhibitions in Ireland and to the 1987 "Irish Women Artists from the Eighteenth Century to the Present Day" exhibition and publication from the National Gallery of Ireland.

W.A.A.G. had one exhibition at the Project Arts Centre in 1987, which featured over 90 women artists such as Anne Madden. The show featured over 100 slides of artwork, which later developed into a catalogued slide bank maintained by W.A.A.G. Their second exhibition was held at the Royal Hospital Kilmainham (later the Irish Museum of Modern Art) in 1988 which featured a number of student artists from the National College of Art and Design. The group set out to be well integrated into international women artists' networks, with the chair of W.A.A.G., Mooney elected to the executive of the International Association of Women in the Arts. Her election coincided with Dublin's year as the European City of Culture in 1991. As part of the celebrations, 11 women artists from across Europe created artworks across the River Liffey on the theme "Women Artists and the Environment", as well as Dublin hosting a visit from the Guerrilla Girls. While the group was active, from 1987 to 1991, they also organised a number of conferences across Ireland.

Committee Members 

 Pauline Cummins (Chair)
 Patricia Hurl 
 Patricia McKenna 
 Marie Hanlon
 Breeda Mooney (Treasurer)

Notable members
Pauline Cummins
Marie Hanlon
Ann Marie Keaveney
Alice Maher
Jane Maxwell
Jane McCormack
Breeda Mooney
Geraldine O'Reilly
Kathy Prendergast
Louise Walsh

References

Irish contemporary artists
Feminist artists
Feminist theory
Political art
Women's organisations based in Ireland
Cultural organisations based in Ireland
20th-century Irish women artists